Over the Hedge is a syndicated comic strip.

Over the Hedge may also refer to:

 Over the Hedge (film), a 2006 animated comedy based on the comic strip
 Over the Hedge (video game), a video game based on the film, using events in the film
 Over the Hedge (Nintendo DS video game), a Nintendo DS video game based on the film, set after the events in the film